Syed Ahmad Sultan, popularly known as Sakhi Sarwar, (1120 – 1181) was a 12th-century Sufi saint of the Punjab region.

He is also known  by various other appellations such as Sultan (king), Lakhdata (bestower of millions), Lalanvala (master of rubies), Nigahia Pir (the saint of Nigaha) and Rohianvala (lord of the forests). His followers are known as Sultanias or Sarwarias.

Life
Sakhi Sarwar, the Great Sufi Saint was born in 1120 AD in the 12th century. His father's name was Zain-ul-Abedin and his mother's name was Ayesha. Sakhi Sarwar's father Syed Zain-ul-Abedin, along with his wife and survivors, had migrated from Baghdad. All this time, the family worked as farmers in Shahkot, Punjab. Sakhi Sarwar's father-in-law was the ruler of Multan. It is said that when his father-in-law gave his daughter's dowry, Sakhi Sarwar distributed it among the needy. Sakhi Sarwar died in the year 1181 and was buried in an area at the base of Sulaiman Mountains in the Dera Ghazi Khan District.

Baghdad is the city where he was blessed with the gift of khilafat by three illustrious saints: Ghouse-ul-Azam, Shaikh Shahab-ud-Din Suhrawardi and Khwaja Maudood Chishti.

After the arrival of Syed Ahmad Sultan also known as Sakhi Sarwar in the 12th century, Islam started spreading in the area. Due to his high moral values and humility, Locals have great respect for the saint's shrine and the town. Before independence of Pakistan in 1947, devotees from Jalandhar, Hoshiarpur and Gurdaspur areas would come to his main shrine  to seek spiritual blessings.

Shrines

Nigaha
The saint selected the town of Nigaha to settle down and live there. It is known as the ‘last place’ because of the hostile geographical and climatic condition. According to Rose (1970), the buildings of the shrine consist of Sakhi Sarwar's tomb on the west and a shrine associated with Guru Nanak Dev Ji on the north-west. On the east is an apartment containing a stool and spinning wheel of Mai Ayesha, Sakhi Sarwar's mother. Nearby is Thakurdwara, and in another apartment is an image of Bhairava.

Within the enclosures of the shrine are the tombs of Sakhi Sarwar, his wife, known as Bibi Bai, and of the jinn whom he had held in his power and who brought many miracles for him.

Near the shrine at Nigaha, there are two other holy spots called Chom and Moza, both associated with Murtaza, the son-in-law of Sakhi Sarwar. At Chom, an impression of the former's hand was said to have been imprinted when he prevented a mountain from collapsing over the cave in which he had taken shelter.

To the west of the outhouses and within the shrine enclosure are two dead trees said to have sprung from the pegs which were used for the head and heel ropes of Kaki, the saint's mare.

Other places
Other shrines in his honor are situated at Dhaunkal in Wazirabad district, and also in Peshawar and Lahore.

There are numerous shrines in the Indian Punjab where they are known as Nigaha. At some places, Sakhi Sarwar is worshiped along with Gugga and their common shrines along with other deities are known as Panj Pirs or Nigahas.

The shrine of Baba Lakhdata at district Una in Himachal Pradesh is known as Chotta (minor/small) Nigaha where a large fair is organised every year.

Worship
His followers who visit  the Pir's shrine at Nigaha are known as sang who refer to each other as bharais. The drumbeating bards who act as professional guides and priests at local shrines are called pirkhanas. Members of a sang address each other as pirbhaior and pirbahin (brother or sister in faith respectively).

Their halting points on the routes are known as chaukis (posts) where the pilgrims traditionally slept on the ground. Devotees unable to undertake the pilgrimage to Nigaha would attend at least one of the chaukis. If they could not, they went to any other village on the route for a night. Those who could not go anywhere at all slept on the ground at home for at least one night in a year.

This ritual of sleeping on the ground instead of on a cot is called chauki bharna.

Fairs
Various fairs are held in the Punjab region. The shrine at Nigaha holds a week-long Baisakhi fair in the month of April.  Fairs are also held at Dhaunkal in Gujranwala district during June/July, at Jhandon Wala Mela (fair of the flags) at Peshawar, and Qadmon Wala Mela (fair of the feet) at Lahore.

A common ritual which is traditionally observed is to offer a raut, (a huge loaf prepared from 18 kilograms of wheat flour sweetened with jaggery weighing half that quantity) once a year on a Friday.

The raut is traditionally prepared by a Bharai, who take one fourth of the rotas offering, the remaining being consumed by the donor family and distributed among fellow Sultanias (followers of Sakhi Sarwar).

A famous fair known as "Chaunkian da Mela" is held in Mukandpur to commemorate Sakhi Sarwar's visit Balachaur, starting his journey from Rattewal and reaching Mukandpur where Sakhi Sarwar reportedly stayed for nine days. Since then, this fair is held in Mukandpur and lasts for nine days. A "Saang" starts from Rattewal and reaches Mukandpur. The leader of the "Saang" holds a flag which is called a "Togh".

References

External links

1120 births
1181 deaths
Indian Sufi saints
Indian people of Arab descent
Punjabi folk religion
Punjabi Sufi saints